Henry Chamberlain (March 17, 1824February 9, 1907) was a Michigan politician.

Early life
Henry Chamberlain was born on March 17, 1824, in Pembroke, New Hampshire, to parents Moses and Mary Chamberlain. Chamberlain attended school until about 1836. In 1836, the Chamberlain family moved to Three Oaks, Michigan.

Career
In 1836, once in Three Oaks, Chamberlain started farming with his family. On November 6, 1848, Chamberlain was elected to the Michigan House of Representatives where he represented the Berrien County district from January 1, 1849, to April 2, 1849. In 1850, Chamberlain stated his own farm. In the 1874 Michigan gubernatorial election, Chamberlain was the Democratic nominee. In this election, Chamberlain was defeated by incumbent Republican governor John J. Bagley. In 1876 and 1896, Chamberlain was a delegate to Democratic National Convention from Michigan. In 1896, Chamberlain was an unsuccessful candidate for the position of presidential elector for Michigan.

Personal life
Chamberlain married Sarah Jane Nash in 1851. Chamberlain was widowed by her death in 1852. Chamberlain got remarried to Rebecca VanDevanter in 1856. Chamberlain was again widowed by her death in 1896. Chamberlain and VanDevanter had three children together. Chamberlain was a member of the Freemasons from 1853 and onward. He served as Grand Master of the Masons in 1872. Henry Chamberlain had two brothers who were also politicians, William Chamberlain, who was a fellow member of the Michigan House of Representatives, and Mellen Chamberlain, who was a Massachusetts state legislator. Chamberlain was Congregationalist.

Death
Chamberlain died on February 9, 1907, in Three Oaks. Chamberlain was interred at Forest Lawn Cemetery in Three Oaks.

References

1824 births
1907 deaths
American Freemasons
Farmers from Michigan
Burials in Michigan
Democratic Party members of the Michigan House of Representatives
People from Pembroke, New Hampshire
People from Three Oaks, Michigan
19th-century American politicians